Bílá Lhota is a municipality and village in Olomouc District in the Olomouc Region of the Czech Republic. It has about 1,200 inhabitants.

Administrative parts
Villages of Červená Lhota, Hrabí, Hradečná, Měník, Pateřín and Řimice are administrative parts of Bílá Lhota.

References

Villages in Olomouc District